John Hartnett (born 7 July 1950) is an Irish long-distance runner. He competed in the men's 5000 metres at the 1972 Summer Olympics.

References

1950 births
Living people
Athletes (track and field) at the 1972 Summer Olympics
Irish male long-distance runners
Olympic athletes of Ireland
Place of birth missing (living people)